The Vehicle first registration fee is the fee charged by the Government of the United Kingdom to register a vehicle for the first time with the DVLA.

The applicable fee was £38.00 in 2006.
Since 2008, the applicable fee has been £55.00.

References
Vehicle Registration UK Government - DVLA

Notes

Motoring taxation in the United Kingdom
Transport policy in the United Kingdom